The Derbyshire FA Centenary Cup was an annual friendly association football competition, primarily played between Derbyshire's two professional clubs, Derby County and Chesterfield. It was contested, intermittently, from the 1983 season until 2010.

Background and history

The Derbyshire FA Centenary Cup was founded in 1983 to celebrate the centenary of the Derbyshire Football Association and is contested in the form of a pre-season friendly. The first ever tie was a two-legged affair between Derbyshire's two Football League clubs, Derby County and Chesterfield, to earn the 'County Title'. Both matches were played mid-season, in November. The first leg, at Chesterfield's Saltergate, ended 5–2 to Derby and the return leg at the Baseball Ground finished in a 1–1 draw for a 6–3 aggregate win for Derby.

After this, matches became single-legged. For the next two seasons, they were played at the beginning of the following season to fit in with to Derby County's touring schedules (so the 1984–85 match was actually played at the beginning of the 1985–86 season and the 1985–86 match was actually played at the beginning of the 1986–87 season), before becoming standard pre-season matches. This meant that two matches were played within six days of each other in 1986: one on 9 August for the 1985–86 season and one on 15 August for the 1986–87 season. The 1996–97 match broke the established timetable and was held in November.

Originally, the venue alternated between Chesterfield's Saltergate and Derby's Baseball Ground but in recent years the fixture has been held solely at Chesterfield.

After several years of sending their reserve team to fulfil the fixture, Derby County declined to enter the 2003 competition and were replaced by non-league Alfreton Town, who beat Chesterfield 2–0. Derby returned for next year's contest, but then pulled out again. This time the match was cancelled altogether for four years. It returned for the 2009–10 season, but has not been played since.

Rules

Matches follow typical friendly competition rules, with a draw being decided on penalties.

Winners

Total wins

Results

Data from Chesterfield FC.

References

English football trophies and awards
Chesterfield F.C.
Derby County F.C.
Defunct football cup competitions in England
Awards established in 1983
Football in Derbyshire